The Sisters of Charity of Leavenworth is a Catholic religious institute based in Leavenworth, Kansas who follow in the tradition of Saints Vincent de Paul and Louise de Marillac. A member of the Sisters of Charity Federation in the Vincentian-Setonian Tradition, the order operates schools and hospitals in the United States and Peru. Members are denominated with the post-nominal letters SCL.

History
The Sisters of Charity of Leavenworth developed from the congregation of the Sisters of Charity of Nazareth, headquartered in Bardstown, Kentucky.

Mother Xavier Ross
Mother Xavier Ross was born Ann Ross in Cincinnati, Ohio on November 17, 1813, one of five children of Richard and Elizabeth Taylor Ross. Her father was a Methodist preacher. At the age of sixteen she converted to Roman Catholicism, much to the consternation of her father. Not long after she joined the Sisters of Charity of Nazareth, and upon completion of her novitiate was sent to Louisville, Kentucky to teach at the Orphan Asylum. In 1853 she was transferred to Nashville, Tennessee, and later to Helena, Montana to take charge of the Academy there. 

In 1858 Mother Xavier Ross came to Leavenworth, from Nashville, Tennessee, at the invitation of Bishop John Baptiste Miege. Before Mother Xavier left for Leavenworth, the community commenced a Novena to Mary, Queen of Heaven. This became a particular tradition. She gradually lost her hearing, and by 1858 was obliged to use an ear trumpet.

Within a week of arriving in Leavenworth, the sisters were teaching in a boys’ school. The days that followed found them opening an academy for girls, visiting wagon trains and traveling to towns to tend the sick during epidemics. They educated black children who had fled to the free state of Kansas, took in orphans, and visited prisoners. In 1864 the Sisters opened the first private hospital in Kansas. Sister Joanna Bruner, trained nurse taught nursing to other Sisters.

Expansion
The Sisters of Charity of Leavenworth came to the Montana gold camp of Helena in 1869 at the invitation of the Jesuits to teach youth, care for orphans, and minister to the sick in the frontier community. There they founded St. Joseph’s Home, the territory’s first orphanage. In 1873, they founded St. Joseph Hospital in Denver, Colorado. In 1875, another St. Joseph’s Hospital was established in Laramie, Wyoming, and soon after, St. Mary’s Academy there soon after.

They founded and operate the University of Saint Mary in Leavenworth, Saint John's Health Center in Santa Monica, California, and St. Francis Health Center in Topeka. From 1864 to 1952, the Sisters of Charity of Leavenworth established or assumed responsibility for 18 hospitals from Kansas to California.

Since the 1960s, the Sisters of Charity have expanded work in social services and outreach, and operate missions in South America and Italy.

See also
Sisters of Charity

References

External links
Official homepage

1858 establishments in Kansas Territory
Leavenworth County, Kansas
Religious organizations established in 1858
Catholic female orders and societies
Catholic teaching orders
Leavenworth